William Kerwick (30 April 1867 – 27 March 1936) was an Irish sportsperson. He played hurling with his local club Ballytarsna and was a member of the Tipperary senior hurling team in 1895.

Biography

Raised In Ballytarsna, County Tipperary, Kerwick was born to Patrick Kerick, a farm labourer, and his wife Catherine. After a brief education he later worked as a farm labourer.

Kerwick first came to prominence as a hurler with the Ballytarsna club with whom he won a Tipperary Championship medal in 1901.

After impressing at club level, Kerwick joined the Tipperary senior hurling team for just one season during the 1895 championship. He won an All-Ireland Championship medal that year after a defeat of Kilkenny in the final. Kerwick also won a Munster Championship medal that year.

Kerwick died in Cashel on 27 March 1936.

Honours

Ballytarsna
Tipperary Senior Hurling Championship (1): 1901

Tipperary
All-Ireland Senior Hurling Championship (1): 1895
Munster Senior Hurling Championship (1): 1895

References

1867 births
1936 deaths
Tipperary inter-county hurlers
All-Ireland Senior Hurling Championship winners